The Patti Pavilion is a venue for the performing arts in Swansea, Wales, located at Victoria Park to the south west of Swansea City Centre. The theatre stages plays, pantomimes, musical shows and fairs.

The venue is named after Adelina Patti, the great 19th-century opera soprano. The building was originally sited in her winter garden at Craig-y-Nos estate. Patti donated the building to the City of Swansea in 1918 and it was relocated to Victoria Park. It is a Grade II listed building.

In 1994, it was given a superficial makeover by the BBC's Challenge Anneka. Already falling into disrepair, the building was further damaged by a suspected arson attack in 2006 The pavilion underwent a major £3m overhaul in 2009 after it became clear that it was not being utilised to its full potential. The project was funded by the City & County of Swansea.  Work began in late 2007 to extend the Patti Pavilion with a new glass covered wing housing an Indian restaurant; Patti Raj, which has subsequently been rebranded as Adelinas Bar and Indian Kitchen.

References

External links
 Patti Pavilion Website
 BBC South West An extract from Richard Porch's book Swansea: History You Can See, about the Patti Pavilion
 Children's attraction set for Patti Pavilion, August 2007
 Patti Pavilion in Swansea address and street map

Mass media and culture in Swansea
Theatres in Swansea
Grade II listed buildings in Swansea
Art Nouveau architecture in Wales
Art Nouveau theatres